Poulton Peak is the highest point on the elongated rock ridge in the northeast part of Blanabbane Nunataks, in Mac. Robertson Land. The summit has the appearance of a rock cairn. The peak was used as an unoccupied trigonometrical station by ANARE (Australian National Antarctic Research Expeditions) surveyor M.J. Corry in 1965. Named by Antarctic Names Committee of Australia (ANCA) for M.A. Poulton, weather observer at Mawson Station in 1965.

References

Mountains of Mac. Robertson Land